Spurrite is a white, yellow or light blue mineral with monoclinic crystals. Its chemical formula is Ca5(SiO4)2CO3. 

Spurrite is generally formed in contact metamorphism zones as mafic magmas are intruded into carbonate rocks. Spurrite's space group is P 2/a. It is biaxial with a birefringence of 0.0390–0.0400, giving second order red interference colors when viewed under crossed polarizers in a petrographic microscope.
 
The calcium is in six-fold coordination with the oxygen, the silicon is in a four-fold coordination with the oxygen and the carbon is in two-fold coordination. One unique characteristic of spurrite is that it actually abides by two twin laws. Polysynthetic twinning can occur along its (001) and another type of twinning can occur parallel to its optical axes.

Discovery and occurrence
Spurrite was first described in 1908 for an occurrence in the Terneras Mine, Velardeña District, Durango, Mexico. It was named for American economic geologist Josiah Edward Spurr (1870–1950).

In addition to its type locality, spurrite has been reported from Riverside County, California; Luna County, New Mexico; and from the Little Belt Mountains, Lewis and Clark County, Montana. It is also found in Ireland, Scotland, New Zealand, Turkey, Israel, Japan and Siberia.

Cement manufacture contaminant
Spurrite forms as contaminating spurrite rings on the walls of cement kilns during the production of Portland cement.

References

Nesosilicates
Carbonate minerals
Monoclinic minerals
Minerals in space group 14